AICAR may refer to:

 Asian Institute of Communication and Research, better known as AICAR Business School, Matheran, India
 Acadesine
 AICA ribonucleotide
 Inosine monophosphate synthase, an enzyme